Secessionville Historic District is a national historic district located near Folly Beach, Charleston County, South Carolina. It extends into the city of Charleston, South Carolina. The district encompasses six contributing buildings, one contributing site, and one contributing site in Secessionville.  The district includes the summer homes of several leading James Island planters, the site of the American Civil War Battle of Secessionville, the unmarked grave of over 300 Union soldiers, and the remains of Fort Lamar, constructed about 1862.

The houses include one Victorian and two antebellum Greek Revival residences.

It was listed on the National Register of Historic Places in 1979.

References

Greek Revival houses in South Carolina
Victorian architecture in South Carolina
Buildings and structures in Charleston County, South Carolina
National Register of Historic Places in Charleston County, South Carolina
Historic districts on the National Register of Historic Places in South Carolina